Renáta Sándor (born ) is a Hungarian volleyball player, playing as an outside-spiker. She is part of the Hungary women's national volleyball team.

She competed at the 2015 Women's European Volleyball Championship. On club level she plays for MTV Stoccarda.

References

External links

1990 births
Living people
Hungarian women's volleyball players
People from Jászberény
Sportspeople from Jász-Nagykun-Szolnok County